Christopher Cole Williams (born July 28, 1981) is an American film and TV actor. He has films including North Country, and Harry + Max (playing a gay teen idol).  He also had a recurring role as Anthony W. on 8 Simple Rules.

Williams was born in Los Angeles County, California, the son of singer-songwriter Paul Williams and Kate (née Clinton) Williams, and brother to Sarah Caitlin Rose Williams.

Biography
Williams attended Proctor Academy in New Hampshire and was accepted into SUNY Purchase College. His debut in the film industry was in the film Urban Chaos Theory. This opportunity catapulted him to roles in Harry + Max, Race You to the Bottom, North Country, Lovers, Liars & Lunatics, Spaced Out and Freeway Killer. He has also landed TV roles and appearances in Scrubs, Drake & Josh, and Zoey 101, but is well known for his role as Anthony in the television series 8 Simple Rules... For Dating My Teenage Daughter.

Filmography

Film

Television

References

External links

1981 births
American male film actors
American male television actors
Living people
State University of New York at Purchase alumni